The Goodwill was a post-hardcore band from Long Island, New York formed in 2001. They released two full-length albums- 'That Was a Moment' on Negative Progression Records in 2003 and 'Insult, Injury, Etc...' on Abacus Recordings in 2005.

Discography

Albums
 "That Was a Moment" Released on February 11, 2003, on Negative Progression Records
 "Insult, Injury, Etc..." Released on March 8, 2005, on Abacus Recordings

References

American post-hardcore musical groups
Musical groups established in 2001
Musical groups disestablished in 2006
Musical groups from Long Island
Abacus Recordings artists